Ģirts Karlsons (born 7 June 1981) is a Latvian former football forward.

Club career

As a youth player Karlsons played for his local club FK Liepājas Metalurgs, being taken to the first team in 1998, at the age of 17. He spent the next six seasons with the club, becoming the second top scorer of the Latvian Higher League in 2003 with 26 goals, completing two hat-tricks during the season. All in all he played 96 matches for his local club, scoring 40 goals. After these bright appearances he had impressed clubs abroad, and in January 2004 Karlsons went on a month-long trial with the Russian Premier League club Shinnik Yaroslavl. Afterwards he signed a three-year contract with them.

However, his spell there wasn't as successful as expected and was very short. After just one season, during which he played only 8 league matches without scoring goals, Karlsons returned to the Latvian Higher League, signing with the newly promoted, ambitious club Venta Kuldiga in 2005. However, the club struggled financially and after just five matches had to let some of their players go, including Karlsons, who returned to his hometown club, Liepājas Metalurgs later that year. He spent the next three seasons there, once again showing great performance. He scored a hat-trick in the 2005 season, and he also scored in the Latvian Cup final on 25 September 2005, which Metalurgs lost 2–1 to Venta Kuldīga.

Another hat-trick came in the 2006 season, which Karlsons finished as the second top scorer with 14 goals. In the Latvian Cup he scored a hat-trick in the 6–1 semi-final victory over Dižvanagi Rēzekne and then scored in the final, which the club won 2–1 over Skonto Riga. In December 2006 Karlsons was named the runner-up of the Latvian Player of the Year Award by the Latvian Football Federation behind the winner Aleksandrs Koliņko, who that time was the first-choice keeper for Rubin Kazan in the Russian Premier League. His contract with Metalurgs expired in July 2007 and it was not renewed. Player was then linked with the English Championship club Bristol City, before going on trial with Southampton. In January 2008 he had a two-day trial with Wolverhampton Wanderers. Karlsons then had trials in the Netherlands with Zwolle and De Graafschap,
 and on 8 February 2008 he signed for De Graafschap, which that time competed in the Dutch Eredivisie. Karlsons returned to Liepājas Metalurgs in the middle of 2008, because of limited game time. After some impressive matches there he attracted interest from several European clubs, but finally settled down in Azerbaijan, signing a contract with Inter Baku in the summer of 2009.

The next season, he became the champion of Azerbaijan. He scored 8 goals in 19 matches for Inter in his first season there, but the next two weren't that successful anymore and in July 2012 he was released. In August 2012 Karlsons once again returned to Liepājas Metalurgs. The 2012 season saw Karlsons scoring 9 goals in 19 league matches. Even though Metalurgs expressed their interest to keep him at the club, Karlsons chose to continue his career abroad, joining the Indonesian Premier League club Pro Duta in March 2013. On 14 April 2013 he scored his first two goals in a 3-0 league victory over Bontang. Throughout the season Karlsons scored 15 league goals for the club, completing two hat-tricks. He left Pro Duta at the end of his contract in November 2013. In February 2014 Karlsons went on trial with the Belarusian Premier League club Neman Grodno alongside his international fellow Igors Tarasovs and signed a contract with the club on 26 February 2014. He scored his first Belarusian Premier League goal in a 3–2 victory over Dnepr Mogilev on 19 April 2014. Karlsons left Neman on 9 June 2014 due to family reasons and returned to Latvia. On 3 July 2014 Karlsons signed a contract with the Latvian Higher League title holders FK Ventspils. He helped the club retain the title for the second year in a row.

Karlsons left FK Liepāja at the end of 2018.

International career

Karlsons played for the Latvia-U21. Karlsons made his first appearance for Latvia national team on 20 December 2003 as a second-half substitute against Kuwait in Cyprus, which Latvia lost 2–0. On 28 December 2005 he scored in Latvia's 2–1 win over Oman national football team to reach the final of the King's Cup in Thailand. Latvia won the cup, beating Korea DPR 2–1 in the final on 30 December with Karlsons again scoring. Currently Karlsons has 50 international caps under his belt, having scored 9 goals. He played in an international game on 9 February 2011, a 2–1 victory in a friendly match against Bolivia, coming on as a late substitute, which would be his last match for the national team until late 2016. Karlsons was recalled to the national team in the autumn of 2016, earning his 50th cap on 7 October 2016 after coming on as a substitute in the 0:2 home loss against the Faroe Islands in a 2018 World Cup qualifier.

Honours

Team
FK Liepājas Metalurgs
 Virslīga champion (2): 2005, 2009
 Virslīga runner-up (5): 1998, 1999, 2003, 2006, 2007
 Latvian Cup winner (1): 2006
 Baltic League winner (1): 2007
FC Inter Baku
 Azerbaijan Premier League champion (1): 2010
CIS Cup winner (1): 2011
FK Ventspils
 Virslīga champion (1): 2014
Latvia
King's Cup winner (1): 2005
Baltic Cup winner (1): 2008

Individual 
CIS Cup top scorer (1): 2011
Latvian Higher League best forward (1): 2006
Baltic League top scorer (1): 2007

Career statistics

International goals

References

External links
 
 Ģirts Karlsons profile at the Latvian Football Federation website 
 
 

1981 births
Living people
Sportspeople from Liepāja
Latvian footballers
Association football forwards
Latvia international footballers
Latvian expatriate footballers
Expatriate footballers in Russia
Expatriate footballers in the Netherlands
Expatriate footballers in Azerbaijan
Expatriate footballers in Indonesia
Expatriate footballers in Belarus
Latvian Higher League players
Russian Premier League players
Eredivisie players
Indonesian Premier League players
Azerbaijan Premier League players
Latvian expatriate sportspeople in Russia
Latvian expatriate sportspeople in the Netherlands
Latvian expatriate sportspeople in Azerbaijan
Latvian expatriate sportspeople in Indonesia
FK Liepājas Metalurgs players
FC Shinnik Yaroslavl players
FK Venta players
De Graafschap players
Shamakhi FK players
Pro Duta FC players
FC Neman Grodno players
FK Ventspils players
FK Liepāja players